University of Technology Sarawak (abbreviated as UTS) is a private university and state government-linked university as it is wholly owned by Yayasan Sarawak located in Sibu, Sarawak.

History
The university was established on 1 April 2013 as "University College of Technology Sarawak" (UCTS). It is the first university in Sarawak owned by the state government. Phase I of the project was constructed by Hock Peng Organisation with Naim Engineering as joint venture partner.

In 2015, the university became the first university in the world to receive platinum award for Green Building Index (GBI). The university building uses 50% less energy comparing to a typical building, using technologies such as LED bulbs with motion sensors, harvesting rainwater for ponds, air-conditioning, flushing toilets, and gardening.

In September 2016, Hock Peng Organisation completed its construction of "Unicity", a commercial area that contains hostels to cater the needs of the university students, a hotel, department store, supermarket, and 80 units of shophouses. UCTS held its inaugural convocation on 8 October 2016 with 100 graduates. During the occasion, UCTS announced its first chancellor, the Governor of Sarawak, Tun Pehin Sri Abdul Taib Mahmud. 

In January 2021, the university become wholly owned by Yayasan Sarawak, the statutory body under the government of Sarawak. In May 2021, UCTS was named as one of the seven most beautiful campuses in Malaysia by a high society magazine, Tatler Malaysia. In November 2021, UCTS was upgraded by the Malaysian Ministry of Higher Education into a full-fledged university as "University of Technology Sarawak".

Organisation
As of 2018, UTS had 140 academic staff and 120 support personnel. Out of 140 academic staff, 30% of them were PhD holders. A total of 1,800 students were enrolled. A total of 300 graduates were produced in 2016 and 2017. As of 2019, the university published more than 354 journals and books.

Academic profile

Schools
School of Foundation Studies
Foundation in Arts
Foundation in Science
School of Engineering and Technology
Bachelor of Civil Engineering (Hons)
Bachelor of Mechanical Engineering (Hons)
Bachelor of Electrical Engineering (Hons)
Bachelor of Food Engineering (Hons)
School of Business and Management
Bachelor of Business Administration (Hons)
Bachelor of Accountancy (Hons)
Bachelor of Business (Hons) in Marketing
Bachelor of Technology Management (Hons)
School of Built Environment
Bachelor of Science in Architecture (Hons)
Bachelor of Quantity Surveying (Hons)
Bachelor of Art in Interior Design (Hons)
Bachelor of Science (Hons) in Property and Construction Management
School of Computing and Creative Media
Bachelor Of Computer Science (Hons)
Bachelor of Arts in Industrial Design (Hons)
Bachelor of Arts (Honours) in Creative Digital Media
bachelor of game development(Honours)
School of Postgraduate Studies
Master in Engineering
Master of Science in Applied Science
Master in Business Administration
Master of Project Management
Master of Science in Business Management
Master of Architecture
Master of Science in Construction Management
Master in Computing
PhD in Business Management
PhD in Engineering
PhD in Applied Science
PhD in Computing
University Courses Services Centre (UCSC)

Research centres
UTS set up six research centres as of 2021.

"Borneo Regionalism and Conservation" (BORC) is created to conserve heritage buildings, structures, monuments, and socio-cultural documentation in Sarawak and Borneo.

In November 2017, "Centre of Excellence in Wood Engineered Products" (CeWEP) was set up to focus on R&D on engineered wood.

In 2019, UTS created the "Centre On Technological Readiness And Innovation In Business Technopreneurship" (Contribute) to develop the digital economy of Sarawak and encourage entrepreneurship with the help of technology.

UTS also set up the "Centre for Research of Innovation & Sustainable Development" (CRISD) focusing on research into the fields of energy, bioresources, environment, and materials. Laboratories have been set up to conduct researches into these areas.

In 2020, UTS introduced three research centres namely "Advanced Centre for Sustainable Socio-economic and Technological Development" (ASSET) for research and development (R&D) activities in rural areas of Sarawak. ASSET has designated several rural areas in Sarawak as learning centres, namely Bawang Assan and Machan villages in central Sarawak and Long Lamai, Long Leng, Long Kerangan, Long Urang, Long Win, Long Jenalang, and Long Latei villages in northern Sarawak. Another research centre is "Collaborative Research Laboratory on Advanced Cybersecurity Knowledge" (CRACK) to conduct R&D activities on cybersecurity in Sarawak. Another research centre is "Drone Research And Application Center" to spearhead the training, application, and research into drone technologies.

In March 2022, UTS set up a special research chair for medical technology with RM 2 million grant from the government of Sarawak named "Datuk Patinggi Dr Wong Soon Kai Chair on Medical Devices Technology and Innovation".

Student life
Since 2021, the university offers UTS Foundation Scholarship where it covers RM 10,000 of tuition fees for each successful applicant. UTS Undergraduate and Postgraduate Scholarships will bear 50% off of tuition fees for those pursuing undergraduate and postgraduate studies. UTS Bursary Scheme was also launched to cover 80% of the tuition fees for B40 (household income between RM 3,000 to RM 6,275) and M40 (household income between RM6,276 - RM13,148) groups who wished to study at UTS, limiting to 100 bumiputera and 100 non-numiputera students.

References

Private universities and colleges in Malaysia
Universities and colleges in Sarawak
2013 establishments in Malaysia
Educational institutions established in 2013